Kotegawa (written: 小手川 or 古手川) is a Japanese surname. Notable people with the surname include:

, Japanese footballer
, Japanese actress

Fictional characters
, a character in the manga series To Love-Ru

Japanese-language surnames